Rai Krishnadasa was an Indian author and scholar who got Padma Vibhushan in 1980 and was the founder and director of Bharat Kala Bhavan.

References 

Year of birth missing (living people)
Living people
Indian writers